The Morgan River is a river of the West Coast Region of New Zealand's South Island. It flows generally west from the small Lake Morgan, high in the Kaimata Range of the Southern Alps, reaching the Crooked River 18 kilometres (11 mi) from the latter's outflow into Lake Brunner.

See also
List of rivers of New Zealand

References

Rivers of the West Coast, New Zealand
Rivers of New Zealand